The Vsevolozhsky family was a Russian aristocratic family descended from the Rurik dynasty.

The family was granted Zherekhovo, a village in Vladimir by Tsar Michael in 1622.

References

Rurikids